Robert J. Waldinger (born 1951) is an American psychiatrist, psychoanalyst, and Zen priest. He is a part-time Professor of Psychiatry at Harvard Medical School and directs the Harvard Study of Adult Development, one of the longest-running studies of adult life ever conducted.

Early life and education 
Waldinger grew up in Des Moines, Iowa. He graduated summa cum laude from Harvard College in 1973. He completed his M.D. at Harvard Medical School in 1978.

Career 
Waldinger directs the Harvard Study of Adult Development. The study tracked the lives of 724 men for over 80 years and now studies their baby boomer children to understand how childhood experience reaches across decades to affect health and wellbeing in middle age (see Grant Study). 

Waldinger writes about scientific approaches to healthy human development and is the Founding Director of the Lifespan Research Foundation, which presents the insights of lifespan research to the general public.

Waldinger is the author of numerous scientific papers as well as two books. He directs a teaching program in psychodynamic psychotherapy at Massachusetts General Hospital in Boston. He has won awards for teaching and research from the American Psychiatric Association, Harvard Medical School, and Massachusetts Psychiatric Society.

Waldinger is also a Zen priest and sensei (transmitted teacher) in both Sōtō and Rinzai lineages, and teaches Zen in New England and internationally. His TED talk on lessons from the longest study of happiness has had over 40 million views and is the fastest spreading talk in the history of TEDx events.

References

1951 births
Living people
American psychiatrists
Harvard Medical School alumni
Harvard College alumni